Austrian Lloyd Ship Management is a shipping company based in Limassol, Cyprus with shipping emphasis on bulk carriers, car carriers, container ships and reefers. It is the flagship company of the Österreichischer Lloyd Group founded in 1991 by Hans-Georg Wurmböck and Eberhard Koch. Today Austrian Lloyd has offices in Austria, Germany, Malta and Beirut.

The name Österreichischer Lloyd is used by the Cyprus-based company in order to associate itself with the former Österreichischer Lloyd, a major Trieste based shipping line prior to World War I, that currently operates as Italia Marittima. However, no legal or other solid links connecting the two companies are available.

Fleet
 MCP Graz
 MCP Linz
 MCP Salzburg
 MCP Vienna
 MCP Villach
 Wilson Sky
 Wilson Hook
 Wilson Hull
 Amurdiep

External links 
Official Site
Port of Vienna

Shipping companies of Cyprus
Transport companies established in 1991
Companies based in Limassol
1991 establishments in Cyprus